Poyyundarkudikadu is a village in the Orathanadu taluk of Thanjavur district, Tamil Nadu, India.

Demographics 

As per the 2001 census, Poyyundarkudikadu had a total population of 1224 with 620 males and 604 females. The sex ratio was 974. The literacy rate was 63.37.

References 

 

Villages in Thanjavur district